Watch Beverley is a 1932 British comedy film directed by Arthur Maude and starring Henry Kendall, Dorothy Bartlam and Francis X. Bushman. It was adapted from a play by Cyril Campion. It was shot at Shepperton Studios outside London.

Premise
A British diplomat becomes entangled with a ring of international criminals.

Cast
 Henry Kendall as Victor Beverly
 Dorothy Bartlam as Audrey Thurloe
 Francis X. Bushman as President Orloff
 Frederic de Lara as Rachmann
 Charles Mortimer as Sir James Briden
 Patrick Ludlow as Patrick Nolan
 Colin Pole as George
 Anthony Holles as Arthur Briden
 Aileen Pitt Marsden as Anne Markham

References

Bibliography
 Low, Rachael. Filmmaking in 1930s Britain. George Allen & Unwin, 1985.
 Wood, Linda. British Films, 1927-1939. British Film Institute, 1986.

External links

1932 films
Films directed by Arthur Maude
1932 comedy films
British comedy films
British films based on plays
British black-and-white films
1930s English-language films
1930s British films
Films shot at Shepperton Studios
Butcher's Film Service films